Obiageli Olorunsola (born 11 May 1962) is a Nigerian badminton player. She competed in women's singles and mixed doubles at the 1996 Summer Olympics in Atlanta.

References

External links

1962 births
Living people
Nigerian female badminton players
Badminton players at the 1996 Summer Olympics
Olympic badminton players of Nigeria
Badminton players at the 1994 Commonwealth Games
Commonwealth Games competitors for Nigeria
20th-century Nigerian women